Horn Concerto may refer to:

 Horn Concerto (Carter)
 Horn Concerto (Glière)
 Horn Concerto (Jacob)
 Horn Concerto (Ligeti)
 Horn Concerto (Williams)